William Moir (19 April 1922 – 9 May 1988) was a Scottish footballer who played for the majority of his career at Bolton Wanderers. He played mostly as an inside-right.

Born in Aberdeen, he signed for Bolton during the war years and made his professional league debut when regular league football restarted in 1946. Playing alongside Nat Lofthouse he was the Championship's top scorer in 1948–49 with 25 goals and continued good goal scoring form in the next few years, although always coming behind the more prolific Lofthouse. 

Moir was captain when Bolton gave away a 3–1 lead to Blackpool in the Matthews Cup Final, scoring in the game. Two years later he left the club to join Stockport County where he spent a further two years as player manager before retiring from playing. He left Stockport County in 1960.

In 1950 Moir gained his sole cap for Scotland, with his selection for the important match against England in Glasgow which served both as the 1949–50 British Home Championship decider and a qualifier for the 1950 FIFA World Cup seen as a surprise in the local press; they also criticised his performance following the home side's 1–0 defeat. He made two further appearances for Scotland B.

He died in 1988 at the age of 66.

References

External links

1922 births
1988 deaths
Footballers from Aberdeen
Association football inside forwards
Scottish footballers
Scotland international footballers
Scotland B international footballers
Bolton Wanderers F.C. players
Stockport County F.C. players
English Football League players
First Division/Premier League top scorers
Scottish football managers
Stockport County F.C. managers
FA Cup Final players
Dundee F.C. wartime guest players